Richard Dana may refer to:

 Richard Dana (lawyer) (1699–1772), American lawyer and politician, father of Francis Dana
 Richard Henry Dana Sr. (1787–1879), American poet and author, son of Francis Dana
 Richard Henry Dana Jr. (1815–1882), American lawyer and author, son of Dana Sr.
 Richard Henry Dana III (1851–1931), American lawyer, son of Dana Jr., and his son Richard Henry Dana IV

See also